Ricardo Raschini (born May 14, 1967 in Capivari) is a Brazilian bobsledder and luger who competed in luge from the late 1990s to the early 2000s and in bobsleigh from 2002 to 2006. At the 2006 Winter Olympics in Turin, he finished 25th in the four-man event.

Raschini also competed as a luger at the 2002 Winter Olympics in Salt Lake City, finishing 45th in the men's singles event.
He switched to Skeleton and did not qualify for the Canada 2010 Winter Olympics.
He was born in Capivari, Sao Paulo, Brazil, and resides there.
He went to ITT Tech, in Framingham, MA and graduated in 1998.

References
 2002 luge men's singles results
 FIBT profile
 FIL-Luge profile
 Terra.com.br profile 
 Torino 2006 profile
 
 Article at Seattle Times

External links
 

1967 births
Living people
Brazilian male lugers
Brazilian male bobsledders
Olympic lugers of Brazil
Olympic bobsledders of Brazil
Lugers at the 2002 Winter Olympics
Bobsledders at the 2006 Winter Olympics
Brazilian people of Italian descent
People from Capivari
Sportspeople from São Paulo (state)